The University of the Antilles, also known in English as the University of the French Antilles, is a French public university, located in the French West Indies.

History
It was previously part of a larger institution in combination with campuses in French Guiana known as the University of the French West Indies and Guiana. As a result of funding disputes, that university was separated into two distinct institutions based on its constituent parts in French Guiana and the Lesser Antilles respectively. The separation process was completed by 1 January 2015.

Location
The university has three campuses:
 two in Guadeloupe: Fouillole (Pointe-à-Pitre) and Saint-Claude, 
 one in Martinique: Schœlcher (while there is also the campus of the IUFM in Fort-de-France and the medical campus (CHRU, a regional university hospital) of La Meynard in Le Lamentin).

Notable people

Faculty
 Jacques Adélaïde-Merlande (born 1933) - historian 
 Carlos Moore (born 1942) - writer, social researcher, professor and activist
 Pierre A. Riffard - philosopher and specialist in esotericism
 Georges Voisset (born 1948) - literary critic
 Suzanne Dracius (born 1951) - writer and literary critic
 Pierre Cahuc (born 1962) - economist

Alumni
 Juliana Rimane (born 1959) - politician
 Annick Petrus (born 1961) - politician
 Sabine Andrivon-Milton (born 1970) - historian
 Micheline Jacques (born 1971) - politician

See also
 List of public universities in France by academy
 University of French Guiana

References 

 http://www.univ-antilles.fr/

External links
 Official web site, serving Guadeloupe and Martinique 
 Department of History in Schœlcher and in Saint-Claude (Guadeloupe)
 University of (French) Guiana

Education in Schœlcher
Education in Pointe-à-Pitre
Education in Saint-Claude, Guadeloupe
Education in Kourou
Education in Cayenne
Universities in Guadeloupe
Universities in French Guiana
Universities in Martinique
Educational institutions established in 1982
1982 establishments in France